Cao Lu (born August 30, 1987) is a Chinese singer, actress, and television personality. She was a member of the South Korean girl group Fiestar.

Early life
Cao Lu was born in Zhangjiajie, Hunan, China on August 30, 1987. She is an ethnic Miao. Cao Lu studied at Chung-Ang University in South Korea.

Career

2004: Solo career
Lu made her solo debut in China under the name Lu Lu. She released her extended play "Cat(貓咪)" in 2004.

2012–2018: Debut with Fiestar, solo activities and Fiestar disbandment

Cao Lu made her debut as a member of South Korean girl group Fiestar under LOEN Entertainment label on August 31, 2012 with their first single "Vista". 

In February 2016, Cao Lu was cast in MBC's Real Men for the female soldier edition. In the same month, she was confirmed to cast in We Got Married along with comedian Jo Se-ho as an couple, which she departed from in September 2016.

In 2017, Cao Lu collaborated with Yerin and Kisum on the single "Spring Again". 

On May 15, 2018, Fave Entertainment announced that Fiestar would be disbanded due to the expiration of the other members' contracts on April 30, 2018. Cao Lu's contract expired a month later on May 31, and on June 1, it was confirmed that she left the company after deciding not to renew her contract.

In September 2018, Lu signed with IOK Company.

In March 2021, EE-Media announced on Weibo that Cao Lu had joined their ranks.

Discography

Fiestar

EP 
 Cat(貓咪) (2004)

Filmography

Television series

Variety show

Awards and nominations

References

External links

 
 
 

Living people
1987 births
Singers from Hunan
People from Zhangjiajie
Chinese K-pop singers
Chinese television personalities
Chinese dance musicians
Chinese idols
Chinese television actresses
Chinese expatriates in South Korea
Kakao M artists
Korean-language singers of China
Hmong people
Chung-Ang University alumni
21st-century Chinese women singers